Anne-Laure Florentin (born 9 November 1991) is a French karateka. She is a three-time European champion in the women's kumite +68kg event.

Career 

In 2017, she won the bronze medal in the women's kumite +68kg event at the World Games in Wrocław, Poland.

In 2016 and 2017, she won the gold medal in the women's kumite +68kg event at the European Karate Championships. At the 2018 European Karate Championships held in Novi Sad, Serbia, she won her third gold medal in her event.

Achievements

References

External links 
 

Living people
1991 births
French female karateka
Competitors at the 2017 World Games
World Games bronze medalists
World Games medalists in karate
21st-century French women